Joseph John Annabring (March 19, 1900 – August 27, 1959) was  a prelate of the Catholic Church who served as the seventh Bishop of the Diocese of Superior, in Superior, Wisconsin.

Biography
Born in Szataryliget, Hungary, he was ordained to the Roman Catholic priesthood for the Superior Diocese on May 3, 1927.

On January 27, 1954, Pope Pius XII appointed him Bishop of the Superior Diocese, and he was consecrated on March 25, 1954. Bishop Annabring died in Superior.

See also

 Catholic Church hierarchy
 Catholic Church in the United States
 Historical list of the Catholic bishops of the United States
 List of Catholic bishops of the United States
 Lists of patriarchs, archbishops, and bishops

References

External links
 Roman Catholic Diocese of Superior

1900 births
1959 deaths
Austro-Hungarian emigrants to the United States
People from the Kingdom of Hungary
Religious leaders from Wisconsin
20th-century Hungarian Roman Catholic priests
Roman Catholic bishops of Superior
20th-century Roman Catholic bishops in the United States